Umm Al Quwain is the capital and largest city of the Emirate of Umm Al Quwain in the United Arab Emirates.

The city is located on the peninsula of Khor Al Bidiyah, with the nearest major cities being Sharjah to the southwest and Ras Al Khaimah to the northeast. There are mangroves outside the city along the coast, with the local economy being largely fishing.

References

Populated places in Umm Al Quwain
Cities in the United Arab Emirates
Umm Al Quwain